The 2015 FIBA Europe Under-16 Championship Division C was the 11th edition of the Division C of the FIBA Europe Under-16 Championship, the third tier of basketball European U-16 championships. It was played in Serravalle, San Marino, from 6 to 11 July 2015. The host team, San Marino, won the tournament.

Participating teams

First round

Group A

Group B

5th–8th place playoffs

5th–8th place semifinals

7th place match

5th place match

1st–4th place playoffs

Semifinals

3rd place match

Final

Final standings

References

External links
FIBA official website

C
FIBA U16 European Championship Division C
2015–16 in European basketball
FIBA U16
2015 in San Marino
International basketball competitions hosted by San Marino
July 2015 sports events in Europe